Ville Heimo Antero Itälä (born 10 May 1959 in Luumäki) is the Director-General of the European Anti-Fraud Office (OLAF) and a former a Finnish politician. He was elected member of the Finnish Parliament (Eduskunta) from the district of Southwest Finland in 1995. Itälä served as the Minister of the Interior under Prime Minister Paavo Lipponen from September 2000 to April 2003. He was elected chairman of the National Coalition Party (Kokoomus) in 2001. Following his resignation as party leader in 2004, he was succeeded by Jyrki Katainen. Itälä was a Member of the European Parliament from 2004 until 29 February 2012. He was a member of the European Court of Auditors from 2012 until February 2018. Since August 2018 he is the Director-General of OLAF.

European Anti-Fraud Office (OLAF) 
Ville Itälä is the Director-General of the European Anti-Fraud Office (OLAF) since August 2018.

European Court of Auditors 
Ville Itälä was a Member of the European Court of Auditors from 2012 to February 2018.

European Parliament 
In 2004, Ville Itälä was elected Member of the European Parliament, a position he held for eight years. During this time, he served, among others, on the Committee on Transport and Tourism and was the Deputy-Chair of the Committee on Budgetary Control.

Finnish Executive and Parliament 
Ville Itala was elected as Member of the Finnish Parliament (Eduskunta) from the district of Southwest Finland in 1995. Itälä served as the Minister of the Interior under Prime Minister Paavo Lipponen from September 2000 to April 2003. He was elected chairman of the National Coalition Party (Kokoomus) in 2001. Following his resignation as party leader in 2004, he was succeeded by Jyrki Katainen.

Education 
Itälä obtained a Master in Law from Turku University, in Finland, and a Master in Law with court training from Vehmaa District Court.

References

External links

1959 births
Living people
People from Luumäki
National Coalition Party politicians
Deputy Prime Ministers of Finland
Ministers of the Interior of Finland
Members of the Parliament of Finland (1995–99)
Members of the Parliament of Finland (1999–2003)
Members of the Parliament of Finland (2003–07)
National Coalition Party MEPs
MEPs for Finland 2004–2009
MEPs for Finland 2009–2014